Tuta is a genus of moth in the family Gelechiidae.

The best-known species is probably the notorious pest of tomato crops Tuta absoluta.

Species
 Tuta absoluta (Meyrick, 1917)
 Tuta atriplicella (Kieffer & Jörgensen, 1910)

References

Gnorimoschemini